Lefka is a neighbourhood in the southern part of the city of Patras, 5 km directly and 6 km south via road from downtown. It was originally called "Botovayia" ("Μποτοβάγια" in Greek).

Lefka is linked with the Akti Dymaion (GR-9/E55 - Patras-Pyrgos-Kyparissia) and Akrotiriou Street (GR-3 - Patras-Tripoli southbound), Evias Street, Iteon Street and Lefkas Street. Lefka's residents work in agriculture, and the remainder work on other businesses.

Nearest subdivisions
Demenika, east

Nearest places
 Ities, west
 Kokkinos Milos, west
 Ovrya, southeast
 Paralia, southwest

Streets
Agiou Nikolaou Lefkas Street
Akti Dymaion Blvd.
Iteon Street
Lefkas Street
Evias Street
The new GR-33 (Patras - Tripoli) - a two way bypass

Geography
The area is made up of farmlands and consists of olive and citrus groves and cattle farms. Tomatoes, potatoes, beans, zucchinis, onions, watermelons, melons and others are also grown in the region. Lefka's nearest supermarket is Akti Dymaion to the northwest. Its total area is approximately 5 to 6 km², and 3 km in length, from west to east, and 2 km in width from north to south.  Its total street length is approximately 10 to 15 km, of which 4 to 5 km are main streets; the rest are residential.  The built-up area lies north of the Glafkos river, which is Leyka's north side, with the exception of a tract north of the neighbourhood.

History
The housing developments to the present day did not reach Lefka, due to that is away from the urban capacity.  Not much housing development has been done since the early 2000s, and the population has been unchanged, compared to other neighbourhoods in Patras.

The Glafkos road was added in the form of gravel in the 1970s. It was later paved in the mid 1980s, became one-way, and was fully opened in 1995. Its streetlights were added in the late 1990s. 

Neighborhoods in Patras